The Taochi, or Taochoi (Taochebi) were a people of Anatolia  in antiquity, known mainly from Greco-Roman ethnography. The Taochoi lived in a mountainous area of the Black Sea to the current borders of Georgia, Armenia and Turkey. Their country bordered by the countries of steels and pheasants.

While passing their lands, Xenophon faced hostility. He recorded that these people were brave, valiant and self-sacrificing to such extremity that after losing the battle, the Taochoi committed mass suicide along with their wives and their children by jumping off the cliff in order not to be enslaved. Xenophon (400 B.C.) describes a similar practice among the Kartvelian Taochi: “Then there came a dreadful spectacle: the women threw their little children down from the rocks and then threw themselves down after them, and the men did likewise. In the midst of this scene Aeneas of Stymphalus, a captain, catching sight of a man, who was wearing a fine robe, running to cast himself down, seized hold of him in order to stop him; but the man dragged Aeneas along after him, and both went flying down the cliffs and were killed. In this stronghold only a very few human beings were captured, but they secured cattle and asses in large numbers and sheep” (Anabasis IV.vii.13-14).

In 1928, a Russian Botanist Woronow published and described an Iris called Iris Taochia in Fl. Kavkaza. It was found in Turkey.

See also
 Diauehi
 Tao-Klarjeti

References

Ancient peoples of Georgia (country)
Tribes in Greco-Roman historiography
Anabasis (Xenophon)